Leonid Oleksiyovych Mykytenko (8 February 1944 – 3 March 2019) was a Ukrainian long-distance runner. He competed in the men's 5000 metres at the 1968 Summer Olympics, representing the Soviet Union.

References

1944 births
2019 deaths
Athletes (track and field) at the 1968 Summer Olympics
Ukrainian male long-distance runners
Soviet male long-distance runners
Olympic athletes of the Soviet Union
Place of birth missing